The Baker Site (designated 15 MU 12) is an archaeological site in Muhlenberg County, Kentucky, located north of Andrew's Run and  northwest of Rochester along the banks of the Green River. The site is a shell midden site dating from the Middle Archaic period. In addition to middens, the site also includes four human graves and three dog graves. A number of artifacts, including projectile points and scrapers, have been obtained from the site.

The first surveys of the site took place in 1938, when pits were dug at the site to obtain material for chicken feed. The site was named for Harry Baker, who owned the neighboring piece of land.  In 1979, a state survey observed that the center of the site had been destroyed, leaving only the periphery — about 25% of the total site — comparatively undisturbed. Nevertheless, the site remains valuable, and its edges are believed to retain substantial amounts of information. Such an assessment depended partly on the surface collection performed by the 1979 survey, which recovered 55 stone tools and 44 artifacts derived from animals.

The site was added to the National Register of Historic Places on April 1, 1986. It is part of the Green River Shell Middens Archeological District, a National Historic Landmark.

References

Archaic period in North America
Geography of Muhlenberg County, Kentucky
Archaeological sites on the National Register of Historic Places in Kentucky
Shell middens in the United States
National Register of Historic Places in Muhlenberg County, Kentucky
Native American history of Kentucky
Individually listed contributing properties to historic districts on the National Register in Kentucky
Green River (Kentucky)
National Historic Landmark District contributing properties